Naudanda is a village in Kaski District in the Gandaki Zone of northern-central Nepal. There are views of the Annapurna Range from this area of Pokhara, Nepal. It is on the way to Sarangkot, the world's 5th paragliding spot 6 km away from Pokhara.

Tourists visit here for recreation, information, and the natural environment. This location is famous for its view of Annapurna range in one side and Phewa lake and Pokhara city on the other. It is at the altitude of 1443 meters above the sea level. Naudada is also a popular destination for bird watchers. It is one of best areas for vultures in the country, including Himalayan Griffons, and Red-headed and Eurasian Black Vultures.

References

Populated places in Kaski District